{{Infobox video game series
| title              = Guitar Hero Mobile
| image              = Guitar Hero Mobile logo.jpg
| caption            = Logo for the first mobile game, Guitar Hero III Mobile
| developer          = MachineWorks Northwest LLC, Glu Mobile
| publisher          = Hands-On Mobile
| genre              = Rhythm
| spinoffs           = 
| italic title       = no
}}Guitar Hero Mobile is a series of rhythm video games in the Guitar Hero series, adapting the normal console-based gameplay which uses a guitar-shaped controller to match notes of popular rock music songs to work with the face buttons on advanced mobile phones, including BlackBerry devices and those supporting the Windows Mobile platform. The first three games in the series—Guitar Hero III Mobile, Guitar Hero Backstage Pass, and Guitar Hero World Tour Mobile—were developed by  MachineWorks Northwest LLC and published by Hands-On Mobile, while a mobile version of Guitar Hero 5 was developed by Glu Mobile.  The series has proven to be popular; the Guitar Hero III Mobile game has been downloaded more than 2 million times, and over 250,000 songs are played each day across the series.

 Development 
Originally, the Guitar Hero Mobile series was published by Hands-On Mobile and developed by MachineWorks Northwest LLC. For the first game, Guitar Hero III Mobile, Hands-On Mobile received licensing from Activision to port 51 songs, two characters, three venues, and four guitars to the mobile version. The game was originally released on Verizon Wireless, but made available on other cellphone carriers in February 2008. The game was programmed by Robinson Technologies (shortened to RTSoft) in affiliation with MachineWorks Northwest LLC. The game graphics were developed in collaboration with RTSoft and MachineWorks Northwest LLC by Anthem Game Group. The audio was taken from the original audio files used by Activision for Guitar Hero III: Legends of Rock. The audio files were reduced in file size, but remained multichannel; for example, separate channels were used for the guitar track, background instruments and vocals, audience, etc. Each song was reduced in length to two minutes to maintain shorter, "bite-sized" gameplay. To reduce the file size used by the phone, only two songs are stored at any time. Accessing other songs requires them to be downloaded via a cellphone network. A five button setup—like in console versions—was considered, but testing showed the game to be more entertaining with only three buttons. Rapid transitions and simultaneous button presses were included to add difficulty to the gameplay and compensate for the missing buttons.

In June 2009, it was announced that Glu Mobile would be developing versions of several Activision titles, including Guitar Hero 5, Modern Warfare 2, and Tony Hawk: Ride for release in the last quarter of 2009. The mobile version of Guitar Hero 5 was developed for Android, BlackBerry, BREW, Java ME and Windows Mobile platforms. In a change from previous games in the series, players are given the option to download MP3 versions of songs via Internet data services instead of using the MIDI versions that come with the game.

Gameplay

Gameplay in Guitar Hero Mobile games was similar to its console counterparts, except instead of 5 frets, 3 frets are used, corresponding to each column of numbered keys on a cellphone's keypad. The numbered keys used are "1", "4", and "7" for green notes, "2", "5", and "8" for red notes, and "3", "6", and "9" for yellow notes. Once the note(s) reach the bottom, the player must play the note(s) by pressing or holding down the number key(s) in order to score points (similar to using the controller on the console versions instead of a guitar). Star Power is activated using the "*" (star) button on the keypad or the "OK" button in the center of the directional pad. Other features include online leader boards, file saves, and accomplishments achieved by meeting certain in-game criteria.  The game features only single player Career mode, working through fifteen songs sorted into three tiers similar to other Guitar Hero games, and Quickplay mode, allowing the player to play any unlocked song at any time.  There are no multiplayer modes in the game.Guitar Hero Backstage Pass adds in role-playing video game elements to the core rhythm game; players not only play gigs as with Guitar Hero III Mobile but also must manage their band from near-poverty to stardom by creating marketing buzz about their band to virtual fans, manage their band, and plan out their performances at venues. Successfully completing these tasks helps the player to earn more money from their performances and to unlock new guitars and equipment that can be used by the band to further improve their performance.

In alignment with the expansion of the console series to include drums and vocal parts in Guitar Hero World Tour, Guitar Hero World Tour Mobile adds in the option to play the drum track for all of the included songs in addition to lead guitar. While drums are played similarly to guitar, the game also includes the bass drum kick, marked as a horizontal line across the on-screen fretboard, requiring the player to hit a button on the phone's keypad below the row they are using for normal drum hits. The game, when played on advanced phones that recognize simultaneous keypresses, support the playing of chords on guitar or simultaneous drum hits. Guitar Hero World Tour Mobile also supports a two-player competitive mode in a manner similar to the "boss battles" introduced in Guitar Hero III: Legends of Rock; a player may be able to collect power-ups that can be triggered in the same manner as Star Power to affect their opponent's ability to play for a brief period of time. No major gameplay additions were made for Guitar Hero 5.

 Soundtrack 

 Guitar Hero III MobileGuitar Hero III Mobile features 15 playable songs from Guitar Hero II and Guitar Hero III: Legends of Rock with additional expansion packs released every month. Song quality and format varies by phone type.  However, only the first two minutes of each song are available to play.

 Main setlist 
As with Guitar Hero III for consoles, the mobile version presents songs separated into three tiers, each with four songs that must be completed before the fifth encore song can be performed.  Successfully completing the encore allows the player to unlock the next tier of songs and play them in Quickplay mode.

 Monthly download packs 
Each month since January 2008, a three-song pack has been released as additional content for the game.  Songs downloaded this way can be played in Career mode and/or Quickplay mode.

Guitar Hero World Tour MobileGuitar Hero World Tour Mobile includes 15 songs with the core game; one or more new songs were released each month.

Main setlist

 Monthly Download Packs

Guitar Hero 5 MobileGuitar Hero 5 Mobile includes 20 songs, stored as MIDI files in the game, though players can download MP3-quality versions via their mobile's data network prior to playing. The songs are a subset of those from the Guitar Hero 5 setlist.

 Reception Guitar Hero III Mobile was well received upon its release. IGN considered it to be a "successful adaptation" of the Guitar Hero games to the cellphone keypad. They commented that while it may be tricky to download the songs for the game, requiring the user to be persistent during the download, the sound quality was excellent and the simplification down to three buttons from five makes the game "accessible to anybody with even a passing curiosity." CNET praised the quality of the sound and animations, as well as the ease of play. Cell Play referred to the game as "the true mobile port of rock," and praised the level of difficulty accomplished with the three button setup. They considered the shortened song length a negligible downside compared to the overall package. 1UPs review criticized the compact layout that led to hand cramps, and that the limited space on the mobile version only allowed two songs to be stored at a time. 1UP also lamented the shorted versions of the songs given the outstanding audio quality achieved on the mobile platform; their review summarized their experience as "As a literal interpretation of the Guitar Hero formula, there was apparently no room to alter the game to emphasize the strengths of the mobile platform." Guitar Hero III Mobile won two awards at the Qualcomm 2008 BREW Developers Conference for "Best Game" and "People's Choice Award". The game has been downloaded by users 2.5 million times, with both Verizon and Hands-On Mobile claiming that over 250,000 songs are played a day on the platform.Guitar Hero Backstage Pass was also praised for the addition of role-playing elements and smaller minigames to bring the series in line with other mobile phone games. The mini-games were said to help build up the anticipation of the performance element of the game, making these feel as necessary elements of the player's band's career progression. The game won the 2009 Webby Award for Best Mobile Gaming application.Guitar Hero World Tour Mobile has also received similar praise to its predecessors. Both CNet and IGN commented on the improvement in sound quality for both low- and high-end phones, with songs being "instantly recognizable" on low-phones, but noted that this quality came with the tradeoff of a larger memory footprint and slow downloads of songs through the cellular networks. However, Pocket Gamer UK noted that on the Java ME version, the songs are only slightly improved over that of a MIDI file. The addition of drums, which is said to effectively double amount of gameplay, and multiplayer to the mobile game was also well received.Guitar Hero 5'' was seen by Pocket Gamer UK to be yet another iteration of the series on mobile platforms, though the game still stands on its own given the numerous other music-based games for mobile phones. They praised the ability to use higher-quality versions of the songs though still allowing those with limited data plans to enjoy the game with the MIDI versions.

References

External links 
 Hands-On Mobile
 MachineWorks Northwest LLC

2007 video games
Guitar Hero
Guitar video games
Mobile games
Video games developed in the United States
Webby Award winners
Windows Mobile Professional games
Windows Mobile Standard games
Android (operating system) games
Java platform games
BlackBerry games
J2ME games

ca:Guitar Hero Mobile#Guitar Hero III Mobile